Ondimba is a surname. Notable people with the surname include:

Ali Bongo Ondimba (born 1959), Gabonese politician
Pascaline Bongo Ondimba (born 1957), Gabonese politician
Sylvia Bongo Ondimba (born 1963), First Lady of Gabon, wife of Ali

Surnames of African origin